The Fighting Champ is a 1932 American Western film directed by John P. McCarthy and written by Wellyn Totman. The film stars Bob Steele, Arletta Duncan, Kit Guard, George Chesebro, George "Gabby" Hayes and Charles King. The film was released on December 15, 1932, by Monogram Pictures.

Plot
After cowboy Loring ventures into boxing, crooked fight promoter Harmon tries to bribe him to throw a bout. Loring pretends to be interested, but Mullins accuses him of cheating. Mullins' daughter believes Loring is innocent and helps him by setting a trap.

Cast           
Bob Steele as Brick Loring
Arletta Duncan as Jean Mullins
Kit Guard as Spike Sullivan
George Chesebro as Nifty Harmon
George "Gabby" Hayes as Pete 
Charles King as Jock Malone
Henry Roquemore as Hank 
Lafe McKee as Sheriff Jim Cosgrove
Frank Ball as Fred Mullins

References

External links
 

1932 films
American Western (genre) films
1932 Western (genre) films
Monogram Pictures films
Films directed by John P. McCarthy
1930s English-language films
1930s American films